The 1991 season was the 71st season of competitive football (soccer) in Estonia. After gaining independence from the Soviet Union in August 1991 the Estonia national football team were managed by Uno Piir. In November the team competed at the reinstated Baltic Cup against the two other Baltic nations, Latvia and Lithuania. The FIFA did not recognize the matches at the tournament as official games.

Lithuania vs Estonia

Latvia vs Estonia

References
 RSSSF results
 detailed results

1991
1991 national football team results
National